The R26 was a New York City Subway car model built by American Car and Foundry from 1959 to 1960 for the IRT A Division. A total of 110 cars were built, arranged in married pairs.

The R26s entered service on October 12, 1959, and received air conditioning by 1982. The fleet was rebuilt by Morrison–Knudsen between 1985 and 1987. The R26s were replaced in 2001 & 2002 with the delivery of the R142 and R142A cars, with the last train running on October 7, 2002. After being retired, most R26s were sunk into the ocean as artificial reefs, but two cars have survived.

Description
The R26s were numbered 7750–7859. They were the first cars to not be built with operating cabs at both ends.

The even-numbered car carried the motor generator and battery set for electrical equipment, while the odd numbered car held air compressor for the brakes. A special version of the H2C coupler was used to link the cars, so they could easily be split if needed, and thus, they were called "semi-permanent pairs". Only the No.1 end had the operator controls. The No.2 end had conductor's controls only. Although referred to as the "blind end", these ends did have windows for the conductor.

The R26s were the first cars to use single, sealed storm windows since the R14s, and pink colored-molded hard fiberglass seats. The hard fiberglass seats would become standard seating from this order onward for all new cars purchased to cut down on vandalism, reduce maintenance costs, etc.

The R26s wore several paint schemes during their service lives. The cars were delivered in the dark olive green color paint scheme slimier to the R21s and R22s. In 1970–1975 the R26s were repainted into the MTA corporate silver and blue scheme. In 1982–1983 the R26s were repainted full white (roof, bonnets, sides were all painted white) in attempt to combat graffiti. During rebuilding by Morrison–Knudsen at Hornell, New York from 1985 to 1987 the R26s were repainted into Redbirds with a deep maroon red body, black front bonnets and anti-climbers, and a silver roof.

History

Early history
The first set of R26s was delivered in July 1959 and placed in service on the  train on October 12, 1959. By early 1960 all cars have been delivered.

Late 1970s–Mid 1980s

Rebuilding
By 1982, all cars in this series had received air conditioning as part of a retrofitting program to replace the cars' original Axiflow ceiling fans.

The R26s were rebuilt by Morrison–Knudsen in Hornell, New York between 1985 and 1987, and were repainted as Redbirds. All Westinghouse cars were refitted with GE equipment.

Before they were rebuilt, the R26 cars were grouped as follows: 
 Cars 7750–7803 had General Electric electrical equipment
 Cars 7804–7859 had Westinghouse electrical equipment

Beginning in Summer 1985 the first unrebuilt General Electric R26s were removed from service for rebuilding. By Summer 1986 the last unrebuilt GE R26s were removed from  service. By March 19, 1987 all rebuilt cars were in service.

The R26s retained their original H2C couplers on both ends until 1991, when the new Scheduled Maintenance System (SMS) program began. During this time, the R26s were mated numerically and the original H2C couplers on the ends with conductor's controls were replaced with link bars. Prior to 1991, the R26s were often not numerically paired and could also be paired to R28s.

Retirement
As time wore on, heavy service took their toll on these cars. In 1996, New York City Transit Authority announced their plans to phase out the Redbirds with the R142 and R142A fleets which replaced the entire R26 fleet.

After retirement, all but one pair were stripped to help create the Redbird Reef.

In 2002, cars 7770–7771 became school cars at Canarsie Yard. This pair was moved to the East New York Yard in September 2006 and continued to be used as school cars there. Then the pair was moved to the 207th Street Yard during the weekend of March 21–22, 2009 in preparation for reefing. The pair was finally reefed on September 6, 2009.

Today, cars 7774–7775 are currently the only surviving R26s. This pair was previously stored at the Unionport Yard until July 2013, when they were moved to the Concourse Yard, along with R28s 7924–7925 and R29s 8678–8679.

References 

Train-related introductions in 1959
American Car and Foundry Company
R026
1959 in rail transport